Capparis fascicularis, the zigzag caper-bush, is a plant in the Capparaceae family and is native to Africa.

Taxonomy
This species has multiple synonyms. The species is said to comprise three varieties, but four are listed:
Capparis fascicularis DC. var. fascicularis (1824)
Capparis fascicularis var. zeyheri (Turcz.) Toelken (1824)
Capparis fascicularis var. elaeagnoides (Gilg) DeWolf (1824)
Capparis fascicularis var. scheffleri (Gilg & Gilg-Ben.) DeWolf (1824)

Distribution and habitat
Occurs from the Eastern Cape of South Africa, through KwaZulu-Natal, Eswatini, Mpumalanga, Limpopo, Mozambique and Zimbabwe. The range extends further to East Africa, Ethiopia, and across northern Nigeria, Niger and the Gambia. This species generally occurs in deciduous bushland and thickets, grassland with scattered trees, upland dry evergreen and riverine forest, and sometimes on termite-mounds. Var. fascicularis is found in dry bushveld or dry deciduous woodland in South Africa, Zimbabwe, Mozambique and Eswatini. Var. zeyheri is found in forest, bushveld and woodland near the coast in KwaZulu-Natal and the Eastern Cape, South Africa. Var. elaeagnoides is found in Zambia, Tanzania, Kenya, Uganda, Somalia, Ethiopia, Sudan, Niger, Nigeria, Mali and the Gambia.

Description
A scrambling shrub or climber, usually with hooked spines on the stem. Two varieties are known in South Africa; var. fascicularis (zigzag caper-bush) and var. zeyheri (coast zigzag caper-bush). The most notable difference between these two varieties is that var. fascicularis has indented (notched) leaf-tips whereas var. zeyheri has pointed leaf-tips. The spines on the coast zigzag caper-bush are usually reduced or absent. The fragrant flowers are whitish and produced on leafless side branchlets which resemble spikes or racemes.<ref name="FloraMozam">Hyde, M.A. & Wursten, B. (2011). Flora of Mozambique: Species information: Capparis fascicularis var. fascicularis. 
http://www.mozambiqueflora.com/speciesdata/species.php?species_id=124440, retrieved 2 March 2011</ref> The fruit are spherical and 6–15 mm in diameter, ripening to purple-black.

Human uses
The leaves are sold as food in markets of northern Nigeria.

Ecological significanceCapparis fascicularis is the larval foodplant of the butterflies Belenois creona and Eronia cleodora''.

References

fascicularis
Taxa named by Augustin Pyramus de Candolle